Lyudmila Vasilyevna Zhuravleva (born 22 May 1946) is a Soviet, Russian and Ukrainian astronomer, who worked at the Crimean Astrophysical Observatory in Nauchnij, where she discovered 213 minor planets.

She also serves as president
of the Crimean branch of the "Prince Clarissimus Aleksandr Danilovich Menshikov Foundation" (which was founded in May 1995 in Berezovo, and is not the same as the "Menshikov Foundation" children's charity founded by Anthea Eno, the wife of Brian Eno).

She has discovered a number of asteroids, including the Trojan asteroid 4086 Podalirius and asteroid 2374 Vladvysotskij. Zhuravleva is ranked 43 in the Minor Planet Center's list of those who have discovered minor planets. She is credited with having discovered 200, and co-discovered an additional 13 between 1972 and 1992. In the rating of minor planet discoveries, she is listed in 57th place out of 1,429 astronomers.

The main-belt asteroid 26087 Zhuravleva, discovered by her colleague Lyudmila Karachkina at Nauchnij, was named in her honour.

List of discovered minor planets

References 
 

Discoverers of asteroids

Living people
1946 births
Soviet astronomers
Ukrainian astronomers
Women astronomers